The sclera and cornea form the fibrous tunic of the bulb of the eye; the sclera is opaque, and constitutes the posterior five-sixths of the tunic; the cornea is transparent, and forms the anterior sixth.

The term "corneosclera" is also used to describe the sclera and cornea together.

References 

Human eye anatomy